Cochino ("pig") may refer to:

Cochino, the Cuban name of triggerfish Balistes vetula
USS Cochino (SS-345) United States Navy submarine named after the triggerfish 
Bahía de Cochinos, Bay of Pigs
Cayos Cochinos, two small islands on the northern shores of Honduras
Los Cochinos, comedy album by Cheech and Chong